The Whitehead Memorial Museum is a western museum located at located at 1308 South Main Street, in Del Rio, Texas. It boasts a replica of "The Jersey Lilly" saloon, and the gravesites of Judge Roy Bean, and his son Sam, the latter of whom "was killed there in a street fight". The two-and-a-half acre property was donated to the city and county for by the Del Rio ranching family in 1962.

References

External links
 

Organizations established in 1962
American West museums in Texas
Museums in Val Verde County, Texas
Open-air museums in Texas
History museums in Texas
Military and war museums in Texas
Del Rio, Texas